St. Jean Baptiste is an unincorporated community recognized as a local urban district in Manitoba. It is located in the Rural Municipality of Montcalm along Highway 75, 40 km north of Emerson at the United States border, and 60 km south of Winnipeg.

The community has a distinct French-Canadian culture. The area was first settled by Métis families from St. Norbert, Manitoba; in 1878, French-Canadian families from the United States arrived in the area and purchased land. The post office opened in 1877 and a parish and Canadian National Railway point were also part of the early development.

The community was originally called Grosse Pointe, then was renamed Mission de la Rivière aux Prunes, before receiving its present name from Archbishop Taché in 1872. It has since been known as St. Jean Baptiste (or simply, St. Jean).

Demographics 

References 

 Geographic Names of Manitoba (pg. 238) - the Millennium Bureau of Canada
 Paroisse St-Jean-Baptiste, Manitoba
 Hotel Pierre Parenteau, St. Jean Baptiste Manitoba Historical Society''

American diaspora in Canada
Saint Jean Baptiste
Saint Jean Baptiste
Manitoba communities with majority francophone populations
Métis in Manitoba
Unincorporated communities in Pembina Valley Region